Sakar may refer to:

Şəkər, Goychay, Azerbaijan
Şəkər, Khojavend, Azerbaijan
Sakar, Nepal
Sakar, Mali Zvornik, a village in Serbia
Sakar, Turkmenistan
Sakar District, Turkmenistan
Sakar International, an electronics and accessories company.
Sakar Island, Papua New Guinea
Sakar Mountain, Bulgaria

See also
 Saka (disambiguation)